Sint Maarten requires its residents to register their motor vehicles and display vehicle registration plates. Current plates are North American standard 6 × 12 inches (152 × 300 mm). Some plates start with different letters, sometimes similar to plates of the Netherlands: V for commercial vehicles, TX for taxi, D for governmental vehicles, AB for buses.Other letters are in use on the Liscence plates like P,M.

See also 
Vehicle registration plates of the Collectivity of Saint Martin

References

Sint Maarten
Transport in Sint Maarten
Sint Maarten-related lists